Timothy Westwood (born 3 October 1957) is a British DJ and presenter. He is often referred to by other DJs and artists appearing on his shows simply as Westwood. He was described by The Guardian in 2022 as "a veteran of the hip-hop scene whose opinions have been able to make or break upcoming artists for more than 30 years". He hosted the Radio 1 rap show and presented the MTV UK show Pimp My Ride UK. In 2013, he left Radio 1 and 1Xtra after nearly twenty years and returned to Capital Radio. Investigations by the BBC and The Guardian into Westwood's sexual conduct found seven women who accused Westwood of sexual violence, as described in the BBC Three documentary Tim Westwood: Abuse of Power.

Early life
The son of Bill Westwood, who later became Anglican Bishop of Peterborough, Westwood spent his early years in Lowestoft where his father was parish priest and moved to Norwich aged eight, when his father became vicar of St Peter Mancroft. He attended the independent Norwich School and the state comprehensive Hewett School in Norwich. He was diagnosed as dyslexic, and later said that, when at school, he was bottom of his class, "clueless at work and poor at sports".

DJ career and radio shows

His career started in the late 1970s and early 1980s when he helped set up sound systems in clubs in north west London, taking opportunities to work as a DJ, and then warming up for David Rodigan.   At the time, he played reggae and jazz-funk.

Westwood's first radio show was on the London pirate radio station LWR. He then moved to Kiss FM, which he co-owned. He was on Capital FM from 1987, and in 1994 he moved to BBC Radio 1 to present its new rap show. The show was launched with a live concert with the Notorious B.I.G. and Puff Daddy. The Westwood Radio 1 Rap Show was the top ranked hip hop show in the UK.

After appearing in the 1987 BBC Open Space documentary "Bad Meaning Good", which was an early work of his own company Justice Entertainment, he achieved TV exposure in the late 1980s, on the ITV-scheduled Night Network, produced by London Weekend Television.

He later presented a series of his own television programmes on UKTV channel UK Play, which has since ceased broadcasting. His Radio 1 show was produced by his independent company Justice Entertainment, which also produced Chris Goldfinger's dancehall show for Radio 1 at the time. Westwood is a patron of the internal radio station at Feltham Young Offenders' Institution in west London.

Westwood was injured in a drive-by shooting in Kennington, South London, on 18 July 1999, after he had been playing at the Lambeth Country Show in Brockwell Park. According to police reports, gunmen on a motorbike pulled up alongside his Range Rover and shot him and his assistant. He alleged that the gunmen were gang members who had been threatening him to stop playing shows in the neighbourhood.

At the BBC, Westwood also hosted the weekday drive time show for 1Xtra from September 2009 until he was replaced by Charlie Sloth in September 2012. After leaving the drive time show, Westwood continued his Saturday night Rap Show which now ran from 21:00 until 23:00 and was a broadcast simulcast on BBC Radio 1 and on BBC Radio 1Xtra. It was announced on 26 July 2013 that he was leaving the BBC after nearly 20 years as part of planned schedule changes, which took effect on 21 September 2013.

After leaving the BBC, Westwood rejoined Capital FM on their sister station, Capital Xtra, initially occupying the 21:00–23:00 slot on Saturday nights. His show on Capital Xtra then moved to a 19:00–22:00, followed by 19:00–0:00, and then between 19:00–23:00. Global, Capital's parent company, announced in late April 2022 that he was stepping down from his show "until further notice" due to allegations of his sexual misconduct, which he has strongly denied.

Pimp My Ride

Westwood hosted the MTV series Pimp My Ride UK which ran for three seasons, from 2005 to 2007. 

The show is an adaption of the American MTV series Pimp My Ride, featuring one car in each episode being renovated and customized ("pimped") to match the owner's interests.

A special episode of the show called "Pimp Madonna's Ride" aired on MTV on Sunday 19 February 2006, the eve of the release of the single "Sorry". The interior of the van was pimped by MTV UK for the single's music video, which was filmed in London in January 2006. The exterior of the vehicle was kept original. 

At the time, Pimp My Ride UK was the most successful MTV UK production of all time and the second highest rated show in the history of MTV Europe.

Tim Westwood TV
Westwood's official YouTube channel Tim Westwood TV has over 500 million video views and over 1 million subscribers. The channel has videos of freestyles and interviews from hip-hop and grime artists, including The Notorious B.I.G., Eminem, Jay-Z, Nas, Lil Wayne, Nicki Minaj, Will Smith, Drake, Amerado, and Rae Sremmurd.

Albums and awards
Westwood has released 14 compilation albums. The Platinum Edition compilation was the biggest-selling British urban album of all time upon its release in 2003.

Westwood has won several awards, including the 2016 Legacy Award at the GRM Daily Rated Awards, the 2010 Radio Academy John Peel Award for Outstanding Contribution to Music and the MOBO Awards for Best Radio DJ in 2000, 2003, 2005, 2007 and 2008.

Controversies and sexual assault allegations
On 6 June 2006, BBC Radio 1 and Westwood's show in particular was accused of encouraging knife and gun crime by the Leader of the Conservative Party and then Leader of the Opposition, David Cameron, who was speaking at a British Society of Magazine Editors event. Radio 1 controller Andy Parfitt responded in a Press Association news agency article: "There's been a debate about this particular genre of music for many years. Hip-hop is of great interest to many people in our audience. I strongly refute [sic] that any of our programmes condone violence, gun crime or knife crime".

Critics have also derided Westwood's apparent Black British pronunciation and dialect.
In interviews, Sacha Baron Cohen has stated that Westwood, including his accent, was an inspiration for his fictional Ali G character.

Westwood has been accused in the media of giving false statements about his age and background. In 2000, at the age of 43, Westwood insisted to a Guardian journalist that he was aged 27.

In July 2020, Global Media & Entertainment, the parent company of Capital Xtra, was criticised for failing to investigate multiple online allegations that Westwood had behaved inappropriately with young female fans. Responding to the allegations, Westwood stated: "I can confirm that such allegations are false and without any foundation."

In April 2022, following a joint investigation by BBC News and The Guardian which included the broadcast of the BBC Three documentary Tim Westwood: Abuse of Power, Westwood was accused by seven women of sexual misconduct, including predatory and unwanted sexual behaviour and touching, in incidents between 1992 and 2017. He denies the allegations. The BBC director general Tim Davie later described the allegations against Westwood as "shocking", though also stated that he could find no previous formal complaints about Westwood. Following the allegations, several venues chose to cancel upcoming appearances by Westwood.

In July 2022, following a Freedom of Information request in relation to the BBC and Guardian investigation challenging the BBC's response, the BBC said it had received six complaints about Westwood and referred one complaint to the police. He is also facing allegations from a woman who says she and Westwood had sex when she was 14, which is illegal in the UK. The Sunday Times reported during the month that 17 women had made allegations against Westwood.

In August 2022, the Metropolitan Police Force confirmed that they are investigating sexual offences, one of which is believed to date back 40 years.

Discography

 Street Beats
 Westwood Volume 1
 Westwood Volume 2
 Westwood Volume 3
 UK Hip Hop 2002 Volume 1
 Westwood Platinum Edition 2003
 Westwood: The Jump Off
 Westwood 6: The Takeover
 Westwood 7: The Big Dawg
 Westwood 8: The Invasion
 Westwood Heat: Volume 9
 Westwood X
 Westwood 11: Ride with the Big Dawg
 Westwood: The Greatest
 Westwood: Hip Hop Club Bangers

DVD
 Westwood Raw DVD

References

External links

 
 

1957 births
Living people
British radio DJs
British television presenters
British hip hop DJs
Pirate radio personalities
People educated at Norwich School
People from Lowestoft
Shadyville Entertainment artists
British shooting survivors
BBC Radio 1 presenters
BBC Radio 1Xtra presenters
Musicians with dyslexia